Dolgoma nigrocribrata is a moth of the family Erebidae. It is found in Guangdong, China.

The forewings are bright yellow with numerous diffuse and irregular blackish spots and small strokes between the veins. The hindwings are yellow, often covered with black scales.

References

External links

Moths described in 2012
Endemic fauna of China
nigrocribrata